Sagenopteris phillipsii are leaves of extinct species of seed ferns.

Description 

Sagenopteris phillipsii has narrow, palmately arranged leaves with anastomosing venation

Whole plant reconstructions 

Different organs attributed to the same original plant can be reconstructed from co-occurrence at the same locality and from similarities in the stomatal apparatus and other anatomical peculiarities of fossilized cuticles. 
Sagenopteris phillipsii may have been produced by the same plant as Caytonia nathorstii (ovulate organs) and Caytonanthus arberi (pollen organs).

References

Pteridospermatophyta
Jurassic plants
Fossil record of plants
Jurassic first appearances
Jurassic extinctions